Pusad Assembly constituency is one of the 288 constituencies of the Maharashtra Vidhan Sabha and one of the seven which are located in the Yavatmal district.

It is a part of the Yavatmal-Washim (Lok Sabha constituency) with adjoining Washim district along with five other Vidhan Sabha assembly constituencies, viz. Washim(SC), Karanja, Ralegaon (ST), Yavatmal and Digras.

Members of Legislative Assembly

See also
Pusad

References

External links

Assembly constituencies of Maharashtra